Woldegk is a town in the Mecklenburgische Seenplatte district, in Mecklenburg-Western Pomerania, Germany. It is situated 24 km southeast of Neubrandenburg. The former municipality Petersdorf was merged into Woldegk in May 2019. Woldegk is 164.14 km² in area and has 4,392 inhabitants (2018).

History

After first being settled as an adjunct of Brandenburg in 1236, Woldegk was brought into  Mecklenburg by the marriage of Beatrix of Brandenburg with Heinrich of Mecklenburg in 1292, and developed into a fortified, walled town with ramparts and moats by the mid-15th century. Between 1492 and 1635, at least four windmills were constructed and put into use milling grain produced in the surrounding agricultural area.

The village was damaged by fire several times, and was completely destroyed in 1647 in the Thirty Years War, after which only 14 inhabitants survived. In the 18th century, the village was rebuilt and as many as seven Dutch style windmills were in operation by 1745.

On June 29, 1764, a deadly F5 tornado hit this town. This tornado was among the strongest ever recorded with damage assessed at the highest level of the TORRO scale (T11). The rating was assigned based on several surveys by German scientist Gottlob Burchard Genzmer.

The town remained economically backward until the late 19th century, when construction of the Friedrich Willhelm Railway in 1893 fostered industrial development, including a sugar beet plant, a steam plow factory, and two brickyards.  Municipal services also were developed, including a gas plant and a water tower and distribution system. During this period, many substantial commercial and buildings as well as a distinctive Rathaus (city hall) were constructed and gave Woldegk a more cosmopolitan flavor, although it remained essentially a rural village.

In World War II, at least 70% of Woldegk was destroyed. At war's end, in 1945, the interior of the stone edifice of St. Peter's Evangelical Lutheran Church was gutted by fire when a phosphorus bomb dropped through the roof, killing a number of refugees from the surrounding area who had taken shelter there.  After the war, reconstruction took place in the German Democratic Republic.  Following reunification of Germany, the region surrounding Woldegk has declined economically, and remains one of the poorest sections of the country.

In the late 20th century, some of the distinctive historic windmills of Woldegk were rebuilt and refurbished, one of which is open as a museum, and the mill pond also has been rebuilt.  Tourist literature and the town's motto promote Woldegk as the City of Windmills (Stadt der Windmühlen).  Efforts to restore the church (the stone foundation of which dates to the earliest years in Woldegk in 1236-1250), are still underway.

Woldegk is located at the intersection of federal highways B 104 (Neubrandenburg-Stettin) and B 198 (Neustrelitz-Prenzlau).

Notable residents
Rudolf Doehn (1821–1895), writer and politician
Kurt von Hammerstein-Equord (1878–1943), general

References

External links
 
Village Church Restoration and History

Cities and towns in Mecklenburg
Populated places established in the 1230s
1290s establishments in the Holy Roman Empire
1298 establishments in Europe
Grand Duchy of Mecklenburg-Strelitz